The Dominican Civil War (1914) was a civil war in the Dominican Republic that started as a rebellion against the government led by General Desiderio Arias in La Vega and Santiago de los Caballeros, beginning on March 30, 1914. José Bordas Valdez was elected President without opposition on June 15, 1914. The U.S. Navy ships intervened to end the bombardment of Puerto Plata beginning on June 26, 1914. The U.S. Army troops were deployed in support of the government in Santo Domingo in July 1914. The U.S. government mediated the signing of a ceasefire agreement between government and rebel representatives on August 6, 1914. Some 500 individuals were killed during the conflict.

See also

 Santo Domingo Affair
 Dominican Civil War (1911–1912)
 United States occupation of the Dominican Republic (1916–1924)
 United States involvement in regime change
 Latin America–United States relations

References

Bibliography
 Atkins, G. Pope; Wilson, Larman C. (1998). The Dominican Republic and the United States: From Imperialism to Transnationalism. Athens, GA: University of Georgia Press. .
 Maurer, Noel (2013). The Empire Trap: The Rise and Fall of U.S. Intervention to Protect American Property Overseas, 1893—2013. Princeton: Princeton University Press. .

History of the Dominican Republic
20th century in the Dominican Republic
Second Dominican Republic
Conflicts in 1914
Wars involving the Dominican Republic
1914 in the Dominican Republic
Civil wars of the Industrial era